Dorcadion preissi is a species of beetle in the family Cerambycidae. It was described by Heyden in 1894. It is known from Turkey.

References

preissi
Beetles described in 1894